The Sa'ar 62-class offshore patrol vessel, are a type of vessel used by the Cyprus Navy and the Azerbaijan Coast Guard. The patrol vessels are based on the  vessels.

Design
The patrol craft have a basic design, but are equipped with modern sensors, systems and weapons. The vessels armament gives them the capability to engage surface, air, and land threats and targets, and the countermeasure system can give them protection from anti-ship missiles and torpedoes. The vessels can deploy small boats for boarding operations, and search and rescue. The vessels have a flight deck for an Airbus EC135 helicopter that can be used to assist the vessel in its missions.

Patrol vessels